The Ultimate X match is a type of professional wrestling match created by Impact Wrestling (formerly Total Nonstop Action Wrestling aka TNA), mainly used in their X Division. It is considered the signature match of the X Division.

Match format 
Ultimate X is contested by three or more wrestlers of the X Division. Two cables, connected to metal structures rising from the four corners of the ring, cross 15 feet above the middle of the ring. Similar to a ladder match, an object (usually a championship belt or a large red "X") is suspended from where the cables cross. The winner is the first person to take possession of the hung object. After Total Nonstop Action Wrestling (TNA) made the transition to a hexagonal ring in June 2004, the cables were suspended from the four turnbuckles that were not perpendicular to the entrance ramp.

TNA official Don Callis received on-screen credit for the idea for the Ultimate X match. The tagline "No Limits and No Ladders" was added to the first match to emphasize the change. In this first match, bare steel wires, which were not secured in the center, were used above the ring, allowing them to bounce separately and causing the belt to tear off twice, requiring it to be reattached. In all future matches, standard ring cables were used, and the ropes were secured at their crossing. Matches were typically referred to by number ("Ultimate X1", "Ultimate X2", etc.), however, TNA has not noted the numeratical order by name. This has only been practiced by fans since X4. The Ultimate X match type is a match type in the TNA Impact! video game, released in September 2008.

Rule nuances 

After Ultimate X4, in which Michael Shane and Kazarian pulled the X Division Championship down at the same time, it was ruled that if both combatants land on the mat while still holding the object, they are declared "co-winners". During Ultimate X6, Chris Sabin and Petey Williams detached the X Division Championship at the same time when A.J. Styles jumped from the top rope to snatch the belt from them while they were still hanging from the ropes, taking sole possession and landing on the mat, winning the title.

During Ultimate X7, the belt was initially pulled down by A.J. Styles; however, Christopher Daniels hit Styles with his finisher Angels Wings and took the belt away from Styles, and was declared the winner because the referee had been knocked out, and did not realize that Styles first detached the title. During Ultimate X8, the object (the red "X") was partially detached, but both Chris Sabin and Michael Shane fell, and the X dropped, untouched, to the ground. Referee Mark "Slick" Johnson stopped anyone from taking the X and had officials rehang it. When it fell later, it fell into the waiting arms of Petey Williams, who was declared the winner. The decision was held up, as this was not the planned finish, and a rematch was held (Ultimate X9) soon after.

Although Ultimate X matches are considered no-disqualification, interference and the use of weapons are rare. Wrestlers are not allowed to use a ladder as a way to grab the object, although technically they may use one as a weapon. In Ultimate X14, however, Team 3D (Brother Ray and Brother Devon) got away with using a ladder because the referee was knocked out.

Variations 

Ultimate X4 was the first match of its kind to take place in a hexagonal ring. Ultimate X7 used a variation of the rules, called the Ultimate X Challenge. The match began under standard tag team rules, yet once a decision occurred, the wrestler who lost the decision was eliminated from the match. The remaining three competitors then wrestling under three-way dance rules to eliminate another competitor. The remaining two competitors then wrestled the Ultimate X match to determine the ultimate winner.

Ultimate X11 was the first tag team Ultimate X match. It was contested by two teams (for the NWA World Tag Team Championship) in a way similar to a Texas Tornado match with all four competitors attempting to obtain the object (one of the two title belts). The team of the wrestler that retrieves the belt won the match and the title. Ultimate X12 was the first Ultimate X Gauntlet match. It began as a ten-man Gauntlet for the Gold, with entries at timed intervals and eliminations allowed. Elimination occurred when a competitor went over the top rope and hit the floor. After all 10 participants have entered, the wrestlers still eligible in the match attempted to obtain the object (the red "X") and win the match. This time, the normal Ultimate X structure was replaced with the Elevation X structure. The Elevation X structure has been used in all matches since Ultimate X17.

Ultimate X14 was the first six-man tag team Ultimate X match. It was held at Final Resolution 2008, pitting Team 3D and Johnny Devine against X Division Champion Jay Lethal and The Motor City Machine Guns (Alex Shelley and Chris Sabin). Team 3D broke an "unwritten rule" by using the ladder to retrieve the X Division Championship. Ultimate X19 was the first non-televised Ultimate X match, taking place at a live event in London, England. Ultimate X20 was the first Ultimate X match since Ultimate X3 to take place in a four sided ring. Ultimate X21 was the first Ultimate X match to feature only two wrestlers and the first that could also be won via submission.

In 2011, the pilot episode for All Wheels Wrestling (a proposed auto racing-themed promotion filmed at TNA's Impact Zone for the Speed television network) featured an Ultimate X match as its main event, retitled as The Big Air Challenge. In this bout, Sonjay Dutt (under the ring name Schwagg D) defeated Jay Lethal (under the ring name RPM), Daivari (under the ring name Dubai), and Aaron Aguilera (under the ring name The Human Cyclone), with 20 points being awarded to the winner as part of All Wheels Wrestling's intended team competition. Of the four competitors, only Aguilera never worked for TNA or competed in an official Ultimate X match. The Big Air Challenge is not recognized as a canon Ultimate X match by Impact Wrestling.

Elevation X 
Elevation X was a variant of Ultimate X that combined the standard match with a scaffold match. It took place only twice, in 2007 and 2008, both at Destination X. In the shape of giant X, the platforms were raised 15 feet above the ring. The two participants would start at the ground level, climb their way up, and finish the match there. The loser is the wrestler who falls from the scaffold into the ring below. After 2008, the match would no longer be contested due to safety concerns. Rhino has participated in and won both matches as he defeated A.J. Styles the first year and James Storm in the second and final year of the match type. After the match was scrapped, the scaffolds would be occasionally used for Ultimate X matches, especially when there was a high number of wrestlers in the match.

Ultimate X matches

Participant list 
Men's

Women's

References

External links 
Ultimate X Match at TNAWrestling.com

2003 in professional wrestling
Impact Wrestling match types
Impact Wrestling
Professional wrestling match types